Ederson Bruno Domingos (born August 21, 1989), known as Eder, is a Brazilian football player who plays as a winger for Aimoré.

Club statistics

References

External links

Eder at Footballdatabase

Ederson at ZeroZero

1989 births
Living people
Brazilian footballers
Brazilian expatriate footballers
J2 League players
Campeonato Brasileiro Série B players
Campeonato Brasileiro Série C players
Campeonato Brasileiro Série D players
Sport Club Internacional players
Yokohama FC players
Ypiranga Futebol Clube players
Canoas Sport Club players
Ferroviário Atlético Clube (CE) players
Veranópolis Esporte Clube Recreativo e Cultural players
Esporte Clube Novo Hamburgo players
Grêmio Esportivo Brasil players
Clube Esportivo Lajeadense players
Grêmio Esportivo Glória players
Esporte Clube São José players
Luverdense Esporte Clube players
Esporte Clube São Luiz players
Clube Esportivo Bento Gonçalves players
Sociedade Esportiva e Recreativa Caxias do Sul players
ABC Futebol Clube players
Clube Esportivo Aimoré players
Brazilian expatriate sportspeople in Japan
Expatriate footballers in Japan
Association football forwards